The JUMPstart RNA motif describes a conserved RNA-based secondary structure associated with JUMPstart elements.  The 39-base-pair JUMPstart sequence describes a conserved element upstream of genes that participate in polysaccharide synthesis.  The JUMPstart element has been shown to function as an RNA, and is present in the 5' untranslated regions of the genes it regulates.

JUMPstart sequences include an ops element, which is an acronym  for "operon-polarity suppressor" and has the nucleotide consensus GGCGGUAG.  The ops element acts in concert with the RfaH protein to improve transcription of genes downstream of the ops element, especially genes far away within long operons.

References

External links
 

Cis-regulatory RNA elements